Extras is a 2001 fly on the wall Chinese documentary film by director Zhu Chuanming. The documentary has been seen as tinged with social criticism in its observation of the lives and dreams of China's poorly paid film extras.

References

2001 films
Chinese-language films
Chinese documentary films
2001 documentary films
Documentary films about the film industry
2000s Chinese films